Do dzwonka is a Polish television sitcom, originally aired by the Disney Channel Poland since 7 November 2010. It is a Polish adaptation of the Disney Channel Italy series Quelli dell'intervallo.

Cast and characters 
 Agnieszka Doczyńska as Dominika "Domi" — main character — she likes Mati and clothes 
 Iga Krefft as Agnieaszka "Aga" — main character
 Magdalena Osińska as Natalia "Natka" — main character — she likes Seba; she is a vegetarian
 Wojciech Rotowski as Mateusz "Mati"  — main character — he loves to play his guitar 
 Marcin Turski as Sebastian "Seba" — main character — he likes Natka
 Piotr Janusz as Konrad  — main character — he likes Domi
 Jakub Nowak as Tadeusz "Tadzio" — main character — he's a nerd
 Jowita Ryczkowska as Aldona — main character — she loves PE, has a crush on Tadzio
 Justyna Bojczuk as Beatka — main character in second season
 Julia Chatys as Martyna — secondary character — she is Konrad's sister
 Karol Galos as Arek — secondary character
 Aleksander Witkowski as Maciek „Kudłaty” — secondary character

Episodes

Series overview

Season 1 (2010-2011)

Season 2 (2011-2012)

Background and creation 
The representative of the Disney Channel Poland Maciej Bral said:

On 24 June 2010, it was confirmed that the Disney Channel Poland would make its first original series. Maciej Bral explained it would be a Polish version of the Disney Channel Italy series Quelli dell'intervallo, that had already had numerous international versions. The most popular have been the British and the American, both entitled As the Bell Rings. The official advertisings began airing on the Disney Channel Poland on 18 September 2010.

See also
As the Bell Rings

References

External links 
 Official Website of the Disney Channel Poland
 Do dzwonka at the Filmweb.pl
 Do dzwonka at the Filmpolski.pl

2010 Polish television series debuts
Polish television sitcoms
Television shows set in Warsaw
Disney Channels Worldwide original programming
2000s high school television series
2000s teen sitcoms
Television series about teenagers